The prime minister of Dominica is the head of government in the Commonwealth of Dominica. Nominally, the position was created on November 3, 1978 when Dominica gained independence from the United Kingdom. Hitherto, the position existed de facto as Premier.
Roosevelt Skerrit is the incumbent prime minister. He took office on 8 January 2004

Authority and duties
According to Chapter 59 of the Constitution of the Commonwealth of Dominica;
 There shall be a Prime Minister of Dominica, who shall be appointed by the President.
 Whenever the President has occasion to appoint a Prime Minister he shall appoint an elected member of the House who appears to him likely to command the support of the majority of the elected members of the House.

The President, acting in accordance with the advice of the Prime Minister, appoints the Cabinet of Minister. The Prime Minister supervises Cabinet meetings and in the spirit of the Westminster system is nominally 'Primus Inter Pares' or first among equals. However Prime Ministers of Dominica, like most Prime Ministers in Small-Island States, have generally governed in a presidential manner.

List of prime ministers of Dominica

References

See also 

 List of presidents of Dominica
 Politics of Dominica
 List of heads of government of Dominica
 List of Commonwealth heads of government
 List of Privy Counsellors (1952–2022)

Government of Dominica
1978 establishments in Dominica